St. Thomas Assembly was an automobile plant located in Southwold, Ontario, Canada, close to the Talbotville community and to the nearby city of St. Thomas. The  facility, situated on a  site, opened in 1967, building the Ford Falcon. Flexible fuel vehicles (FFV) capable of operating on ethanol fuel were manufactured there during the later years of the assembly plant. Ford's plans for sustainability and reduction of fossil fuel consumption relied on the St. Thomas Plant and its Lincoln Town Car vehicles for years. It also produced the final Mercury vehicle, a Mercury Grand Marquis, after Ford decided to discontinue the Mercury brand after the 2011 model year.

Following the closure of the Wixom Assembly Plant in Michigan, production of the Lincoln Town Car (which was the only Ford Panther platform vehicle to be produced at the Plant) moved to St. Thomas Assembly starting with the 2007 model year. This allowed the Ford Motor Company to consolidate production of all three Ford Panther platform vehicles (the Ford Crown Victoria, the Lincoln Town Car, and the Mercury Grand Marquis to a single assembly plant. 

The plant closed on September 15, 2011. The last Crown Victoria built by the remaining 300 employees was sent to Saudi Arabia.

Decommissioning did not start until mid-2015. The plant had been largely demolished by the end of 2016, with only the wastewater treatment facility left standing as of February 2017. An initial proposal to have the site developed as a solar farm fell through when regulatory approval was not obtained, but decommissioning was completed in 2019, with the property becoming available for sale.  In 2021, Amazon purchased the site to build a fulfillment center.

Products
In total, over eight million vehicles were produced by St. Thomas Assembly from 1967 to 2011.  Alongside the vehicles of the Ford Panther platform, St. Thomas also produced the Ford Falcon, Ford Maverick (Mercury Comet), Ford Pinto (Mercury Bobcat), Ford Fairmont (Mercury Zephyr), and Ford Escort EXP (Mercury LN7).

Ford

Mercury

Lincoln

References

Ford factories
Former motor vehicle assembly plants
Motor vehicle assembly plants in Canada
Buildings and structures in Elgin County
1967 establishments in Ontario
2011 disestablishments in Ontario